This is a list of places in Taiwan which have standing links to local communities in other countries. In most cases, the association, especially when formalised by local government, is known as "town twinning" (usually in Europe) or "sister cities" (usually in the rest of the world).

C
Changhua

 Muncie, United States
 San Gabriel, United States

Chiayi

 Bulacan, Philippines
 East Orange, United States
 Hsinchu, Taiwan
 Jackson, United States
 Juneau, United States
 Martinsburg, United States
 Miaoli, Taiwan
 Murray, United States
 Syracuse, United States

H
Hsinchu

 Airai, Palau
 Beaverton, United States
 Cary, United States
 Chiayi, Taiwan
 Cupertino, United States
 Fairfield, Australia
 Okayama, Japan
 Plano, United States
 Puerto Princesa, Philippines
 Richland, United States

Hsinchu County

 Santa Clara County, United States
 Westmont, United States

Hualien

 Albuquerque, United States
 Bellevue, United States
 Jecheon, South Korea
 Oudtshoorn, South Africa
 Takachiho, Japan
 Ulsan, South Korea
 Yonaguni, Japan

K
Kaohsiung

 Barranquilla, Colombia
 Belize City, Belize
 Blantyre, Malawi
 Brisbane, Australia
 Busan, South Korea
 Cartago, Costa Rica
 Cebu City, Philippines
 Colorado Springs, United States
 Da Nang, Vietnam
 Durban, South Africa
 Fort Lauderdale, United States
 Hachiōji, Japan
 Honolulu, United States
 Knoxville, United States
 Little Rock, United States
 Macon, United States
 Miami, United States

 Panama City, Panama
 Pensacola, United States
 Plains, United States
 Portland, United States
 San Antonio, United States
 Seattle, United States
 Surabaya, Indonesia
 Tulsa, United States

Keelung

 Corpus Christi, United States
 Kure, Japan
 Marrickville (Inner West), Australia
 Rosemead, United States
 Salt Lake City, United States
 Sangju, South Korea
 Yakima, United States
 Yatsushiro, Japan

M
Miaoli

 Bartlett, United States
 Chiayi, Taiwan

N
Nantou

 Ipswich, Australia
 West Valley City, United States
 Yeongju, South Korea

Nantou – Puli
 Izumi, Japan

New Taipei

 Baltimore County, United States
 Cincinnati, United States
 Harris County, United States
 Jaluit Atoll, Marshall Islands
 Los Angeles County, United States
 Loudoun County, United States
 Miami-Dade County, United States
 Richland County, United States
 Rizal, Philippines
 Starnberg (district), Germany

New Taipei – Tamsui
 San Marino, United States

New Taipei – Xindian

 Flagstaff, United States
 Tavares, United States

New Taipei – Xizhi
 Doral, United States

New Taipei – Yonghe
 Monterey Park, United States

P
Pingtung
 Maui County, United States

Pingtung – Hengchun
 Sunny Isles Beach, United States

T
Taichung

 Auckland, New Zealand
 Austin, United States
 Baton Rouge, United States
 Cheyenne, United States
 Chungju, South Korea
 Columbia, United States
 Columbus, United States
 Contra Costa County, United States
 Kwajalein Atoll, Marshall Islands
 Makati, Philippines
 Manchester, United States
 Mexicali, Mexico
 Montgomery County, United States
 Msunduzi, South Africa
 Nassau County, United States
 New Haven, United States
 Petah Tikva, Israel
 Reno, United States
 San Diego, United States
 San Pedro Sula, Honduras
 Santa Cruz de la Sierra, Bolivia
 Sumter County, United States
 Tacoma, United States
 Tucson, United States
 Uvs, Mongolia
 Winnipeg, Canada

Taichung – Wuqi
 Newton, United States

Tainan

 Cagayan de Oro, Philippines
 Carbondale, United States
 Cavite City, Philippines
 Columbus, United States
 Elbląg, Poland
 Fairbanks, United States
 Gold Coast, Australia
 Gwangju, South Korea
 Huntsville, United States
 Kansas City, United States
 Kinmen, Taiwan
 Laredo, United States
 Monterey, United States
 Nelson Mandela Bay, South Africa
 Oklahoma City, United States
 Orlando, United States
 Pasay, Philippines
 Ra'anana, Israel
 San Jose, United States
 Santa Cruz de la Sierra, Bolivia
 Snohomish County, United States
 Tagaytay, Philippines
 Trece Martires, Philippines
 Wotje Atoll, Marshall Islands
 Zacapa, Guatemala

Taipei

 Asunción, Paraguay
 Atlanta, United States
 Banjul, Gambia
 Belmopan, Belize
 Bissau, Guinea-Bissau
 Boston, United States
 Castries, Saint Lucia
 Cleveland, United States
 Cotonou, Benin
 Daegu, South Korea
 Dakar, Senegal
 Dallas, United States
 Gold Coast, Australia
 Guam, United States
 Guatemala City, Guatemala
 Houston, United States
 Indianapolis, United States
 Jeddah, Saudi Arabia
 Johannesburg, South Africa
 Lilongwe, Malawi
 Lima, Peru
 Lomé, Togo
 Los Angeles, United States
 Majuro, Marshall Islands
 Managua, Nicaragua
 Manila, Philippines
 Marshall, United States
 Mbabane, Eswatini
 Monrovia, Liberia
 Oklahoma City, United States
 Ouagadougou, Burkina Faso
 Panama City, Panama
 La Paz, Bolivia
 Phoenix, United States
 Prague, Czech Republic
 Pretoria, South Africa
 Quezon City, Philippines
 Quito, Ecuador
 Riga, Latvia
 San Francisco, United States
 San José, Costa Rica
 San Nicolás de los Garza, Mexico
 San Salvador, El Salvador
 Santo Domingo, Dominican Republic
 Seoul, South Korea
 Tegucigalpa, Honduras
 Ulaanbaatar, Mongolia
 Ulan-Ude, Russia
 Versailles, France
 Vilnius, Lithuania
 Warsaw, Poland

Taipei – Shilin
 Los Altos, United States

Taitung

 Baguio, Philippines
 Debrecen, Hungary
 Sokcho, South Korea
 Storm Lake, United States

Taoyuan

 Alameda County, United States
 Dallas County, United States
 DeSoto, United States
 Fulton County, United States
 Garland, United States
 Hartford County, United States
 Irvine, United States
 Kaga, Japan
 Kennewick, United States
 Logan, Australia
 Narita, Japan
 Radom, Poland
 Ramat Gan, Israel
 San Bernardino County, United States
 Singkawang, Indonesia

Taoyuan – Guishan
 Grand Prairie, United States

Taoyuan – Zhongli

 Enfield, United States
 Gumi, South Korea

Y
Yilan

 Leawood, United States
 Madera, United States
 Rockville, United States

References

Twin towns and sister
Taiwan
Twin towns
twin towns and sister cities